Senator McDowell may refer to:

Charles S. McDowell (1871–1943), Alabama State Senate
Charles McDowell (North Carolina militiaman) (1743–1815), North Carolina State Senate
Harris McDowell III (born 1940), Delaware State Senate
Harris McDowell (1906–1988), Delaware State Senate
John G. McDowell (1794–1866), New York State Senate
Joseph J. McDowell (1800–1877), Ohio State Senate
William John McDowell (1861–1929), Northern Irish Senate